Indonesia participated in the 2014 Asian Para Games the second edition of Asian Para Games in Incheon, South Korea from 18 to 24 October 2014. Indonesia will compete in 9 sports such as archery, athletic, badminton, powerlifting, swimming, ten-pin bowling, table tennis, wheelchair rugby and wheelchair tennis.

Competitors

Medal summary

|  style="text-align:left; width:22%; vertical-align:top;"|

Medal by sport

Medal by Date

Medalists

Last updated 23 October 2014

Archery

Athletics

Men

Women

Badminton

Men

Women

Mixed

Powerlifting

Men

Women

Swimming

Men

Women

Table tennis

Men

Women

Ten-pin bowling

Wheelchair rugby

Wheelchair tennis

Men

References

Nations at the 2014 Asian Para Games
2014
Asian Para Games